Frank B. Golla Jr. (born January 17, 1990) is a Filipino basketball player who last played for the Blackwater Bossing of the Philippine Basketball Association (PBA). He was drafted 23rd overall by Blackwater in the 2014 PBA draft.

Career statistics

College 

|-
| align="left" | 2009-10
| align="left"; rowspan=5| Ateneo
| 11 || 2.7 || — || — || .750 || .9 || — || — || — || .3
|-
| align="left" | 2010-11
| 17 || 18.1 || .449 || — || .625 || 5.5 || .4 || .2 || .4 || 3.5
|-
| align="left" | 2011-12
| 12 || 12.8 || .267 || — || 1.000 || 3.5 || .8 || .1 || .3 || 1.0
|-
| align="left" | 2012-13
| 13 || 6.8 || .400 || — || 1.000 || 1.8 || .1 || .1 || .5 || .8
|-
| align="left" | 2013-14
| 14 || 23.2 || .426 || — || .556 || 2.9 || .4 || .3 || .1 || 4.5
|-class=sortbottom
| align="center" colspan=2 | Career
| 67 || 13.5 || .413 || — || .689 || 3.1 || .3 || .1 || .3 || 2.2

PBA season-by-season averages
As of the end of 2021 season 
|-
| align=left | 
| align="left" rowspan="2" | Blackwater
| 7 || 6.4 || .125 || – || .750 || 1.4 || .0 || .0 || .1 || 1.1
|-
| align=left | 
| 22 || 10.5 || .465 || – || .500 || 2.5 || .3 || .2 || .3 || 1.9
|-
| align=left | 
| align="left" rowspan="3" | TNT
| 24 || 3.5 || .111 || .200 || 1.000 || .8 || .0 || .0 || .1 || .5
|-
| align=left | 
| 21 || 6.4 || .269 || .200 || .500 || 1.5 || .4 || .1 || .0 || .9
|-
| align=left | 
| 13 || 3.6 || .222 || .200 || .000 || .5 || .2 || .1 || .2 || .4
|-
| align=left | 
| align="left" rowspan="2" | Blackwater
| 11 || 20.8 || .278 || .231 || .750 || 3.3 || 1.1 || .5 || .5 || 4.4
|-
| align=left | 
| 7 || 15.5 || .367 || .381 || .800 || 3.3 || .9 || .6 || .4 || 5.4
|-class=sortbottom
| align=center colspan=2 | Career
| 105 || 8.3 || .309 || .256 || .738 || 1.7 || .3 || .2 || .2 || 1.6

References

1990 births
Living people
Blackwater Bossing players
Centers (basketball)
Filipino men's basketball players
Power forwards (basketball)
Basketball players from Quezon City
TNT Tropang Giga players
Ateneo Blue Eagles men's basketball players
Blackwater Bossing draft picks